This article lists events that occurred during 1956 in Estonia.

Incumbents

Events
Kalevi Keskstaadion was built.

Births
25 November – Kalle Randalu, Estonian pianist

Deaths

References

 
1950s in Estonia
Estonia
Estonia
Years of the 20th century in Estonia